A treadle (from , "to tread") is a mechanism operated with a pedal for converting reciprocating motion into rotating motion. Along with cranks, treadmills, and treadwheels, treadles allow human and animal machine power in the absence of electricity.

Before the widespread availability of electric power, treadles were widely used to power a range of machines. They may still be used as a matter of preference or in environments where electric power is not available.

Operation and uses

A treadle is operated by pressing down on its pedal with one or both feet, causing a rocking motion. This movement can then be stored as rotational motion via a crankshaft driving a flywheel. Alternatively, energy can be stored in a spring as in the pole lathe.

Treadles were once used extensively to power most machines including lathes, rotating or reciprocating saws, spinning wheels, looms, and sewing machines. The last use was popularized by Elias Howe and Isaac Singer in the eponymous Singer sewing machines. Today the use of treadle-powered machines is mostly relegated to hobbyists and historical re-enactors, as well as in areas of the developing world where other forms of power remain unavailable.

See also

 Bicycle pedal
 Treadle bicycle
 Treadle pump
 Sewing machine

Mechanical engineering